Castilleja occidentalis is a member of the genus Castilleja (paintbrush), commonly referred to as western Indian paintbrush. Like other members, it is a hemi-parasite.

Distribution
This species has a wide distribution, from the Rocky Mountains north to BC, Alberta and Montana (Glacier National Park) and south to Utah and New Mexico (but not known in Wyoming or Idaho)

Habitat
The western paintbrush occurs in areas above and below the treeline. It is found in dry places, favoring rocky soils and talus slopes. It has thin, lanceolate leaves (with occasionally lobed upper leaves) borne on woody stems. The bracts are pale yellow to nearly white. Along with the plants' habitat, this coloration aids identification.

However, this paintbrush often occurs in fragile wet meadows, where it is vulnerable to trampling. Further, coloration can vary to red and purple with all colors between.

Associated plants
The western paintbrush is often associated with tufted hairgrass (Deschampsia caespitosa), golden avens (Geum rossii), and Bellard kobresia (Kobresia myosuroides)

References

occidentalis
Flora of Colorado
Flora of Idaho
Flora of Montana
Flora of New Mexico
Flora of Utah
Flora of Western Canada
Plants described in 1827